Edward Vincent Breding (born November 3, 1944) is a former American football linebacker in the National Football League for the Washington Redskins.  He played college football at Texas A&M University and was drafted in the 15th round of the 1967 NFL Draft. Breding spent the 1967 and 1968 seasons with the Redskins, appearing in 28 games as a middle linebacker.

References

1944 births
Living people
American football linebackers
Washington Redskins players
Texas A&M Aggies football players
Sportspeople from Billings, Montana